The 1920 Ohio gubernatorial election was held on November 2, 1920. Republican nominee Harry L. Davis defeated Democratic nominee A. Victor Donahey with 51.91% of the vote.

Primary elections
Primary elections were held on August 10, 1920.

Republican primary

Candidates
Harry L. Davis, former mayor of Cleveland
Ralph D. Cole, former U.S. Representative
Roscoe C. McCulloch, U.S. Representative
David Wesley Wood

Results

General election

Candidates
Major party candidates
Harry L. Davis, Republican 
A. Victor Donahey, Democratic

Other candidates
Frank B. Hamilton, Socialist
Earl H. Foote, Independent

Results

References

1920
Ohio
Gubernatorial